Cunot is an unincorporated community in Jackson Township, Owen County, in the U.S. state of Indiana. It lies near the intersection of Indiana Highway 42 and Indiana Highway 243, which is a community about twenty miles north of the city of Spencer, the county seat of Owen County.  Its elevation is 722 feet (220 m), and it is located at  (39.4564339 -86.8547315). Although this community is located within Owen County on its northern boundary, it has an address of Cloverdale, Indiana in Putnam County, which is about six miles northeast of the community.

History
A post office was established at Cunot in 1894, and remained in operation until it was discontinued in 1905. The community's name may be derived from "Q-knot", alluding to the shape of a local road.

Geography
This community is on the east side of Cagles Mill Lake, which is located at  (39.4644628 -86.8829156).

Richard Lieber State Park is northwest of this community, the park located at  (39.4792115 -86.8744544).

School districts
 Cloverdale Community Schools.

Political districts
 State House District 46
 State Senate District 39

References

External links
 Roadside Thoughts for Cunot, Indiana
 Cloverdale Community Schools

Unincorporated communities in Owen County, Indiana
Unincorporated communities in Indiana